The following is a list of West Coast blues musicians.

Dave Alexander
Charlie Baty
Juke Boy Bonner
Freddie Brooks
Charles Brown
Roy Brown
Pee Wee Crayton
Sugar Pie DeSanto
Floyd Dixon
Jesse Fuller
Johnny Fuller
Lowell Fulson
Cecil Gant
Lloyd Glenn
Peppermint Harris
Roy Hawkins
Johnny Heartsman
Duke Henderson
Ivory Joe Hunter
Etta James
Little Willie Littlefield
Robert Lowery
J.J. Malone
Percy Mayfield
Jimmy McCracklin
Big Jay McNeely
Amos Milburn
Roy Milton
Jimmy Nelson
Johnny Otis
Rod Piazza
Sonny Rhodes
L. C. Robinson
Haskell Sadler
George "Harmonica" Smith
Lafayette Thomas
Big Mama Thornton
Luther Tucker
Big Joe Turner
Eddie Vinson
Joe Louis Walker
T-Bone Walker
Ike & Tina Turner
Johnny "Guitar" Watson
Junior Watson

References
AllMusic

West Coast